Heinz Reinhard Becker (August 26, 1915 – November 11, 1991) was a Major League Baseball first baseman who played for the Chicago Cubs (1943, 1945–46) and Cleveland Indians (1946–47). Born in Berlin, Germany, he was one of only 27 German-born players in MLB history as of 2010.

Career
Becker may be best known for being a key reserve on the 1945 Chicago Cubs, the last Cubs team to win a National League pennant until 2016. He got into 67 games and hit .286 with two home runs, 27 runs batted in, and 25 runs scored. He played solid defense, making no errors in 28 appearances at first base. In the 1945 World Series he made three appearances as a pinch hitter, going 1-for-2 with a walk. His hit was a single against winning pitcher Dizzy Trout in Game 4.

He was traded by the Cubs to the Cleveland Indians for first baseman Mickey Rocco and cash on June 26, 1946 and hit .299 in 59 games that season.  He was released by Cleveland on May 14, 1947. He signed with the Boston Braves two days later, but never again appeared in a major league game.

Career totals include 152 games played, 92 hits, 2 HR, 47 RBI, 45 runs scored, and a lifetime batting average of .263. His on-base percentage was .359, and he had a slugging percentage of .346. He had a lifetime fielding percentage of .994 in 90 appearances at first base and participated in 64 double plays.

Legacy
Becker died at the age of 76 in Dallas, Texas.

Becker had problems with his feet during his playing career, earning him the nickname "Bunions". He was referenced in Chicago columnist Mike Royko's annual Cubs quiz on April 18, 1968:

Q: Which of these two players always had sore feet? Heinz Becker or the immortal Dominic Dallessandro?
A: Becker had sore feet. Dallessandro had tiny feet. It used to take him twenty jumps to get out of the dugout.

References

External links

Retrosheet

1915 births
1991 deaths
Chicago Cubs players
Cleveland Indians players
Corpus Christi Aces players
Dallas Eagles players
Dallas Rebels players
German emigrants to the United States
Longview Texans players
Major League Baseball first basemen
Major League Baseball players from Germany
Milwaukee Brewers (minor league) players
Nashville Vols players
Oklahoma City Indians players
Palestine Pals players
Rayne Rice Birds players
Seattle Rainiers players
Sportspeople from Berlin
Tyler Trojans players